Torkelsen  and Torkelson are Norwegian and Danish patronymic surnames which may refer to:

People
Red Torkelson (1894–1964), American professional baseball pitcher
Eric Torkelson (born 1952), American football running back 
John M. Torkelson, American physicist
Paul Torkelson (born 1952), American politician and a member of the Minnesota House of Representatives 
Spencer Torkelson (born 1999), American professional baseball infielder
Per Inge Torkelsen (1953–2021), Norwegian comic, author, radio personality

Other
The Torkelsons, American television sitcom 

Surnames  
Norwegian-language surnames
Danish-language surnames